Cryptodictyon is a genus of lichenized fungi within the Lecideaceae family.

References

Lecideales genera
Lichen genera
Lecideales